Tazeh Kand-e Qarah Bolagh (also Romanized as Tāzeh Kand-e Qarah Bolāgh; also known as Tāzeh Kand) is a village in Ani Rural District, in the Central District of Germi County, Ardabil Province, Iran. At the 2006 census, its population was 89, in 15 families.

References 

Towns and villages in Germi County